In astronomy, an extraterrestrial sky is a view of outer space from the surface of an astronomical body other than Earth.

The only extraterrestrial sky that has been directly observed and photographed by astronauts is that of the Moon. The skies of Venus, Mars and Titan  have been observed by space probes designed to land on the surface and transmit images back to Earth.

Characteristics of extraterrestrial sky appear to vary substantially due to a number of factors. An extraterrestrial atmosphere, if present, has a large bearing on visible characteristics. The atmosphere's density and chemical composition can contribute to differences in colour, opacity (including haze) and the presence of clouds. Astronomical objects may also be visible and can include natural satellites, rings, star systems and nebulas and other planetary system bodies.

Luminosity and angular diameter of the Sun

The Sun's apparent magnitude changes according to the inverse square law, therefore, the difference in magnitude as a result of greater or lesser distances from different celestial bodies can be predicted by the following formula:

Where "distance" can be in km, AU, or any other appropriate unit.

To illustrate, since Pluto is 40 AU away from the Sun on average, it follows that the parent star would appear to be  times as bright as it is on Earth.

Though a terrestrial observer would find a dramatic decrease in available sunlight in these environments, the Sun would still be bright enough to cast shadows even as far as the hypothetical Planet Nine, possibly located 1,200 AU away, and by analogy would still outshine the full Moon as seen from Earth.

The change in angular diameter of the Sun with distance is illustrated in the diagram below:

The angular diameter of a circle whose plane is perpendicular to the displacement vector between the point of view and the centre of said circle can be calculated using the formula

When , we have , and the result obtained is in radians.

For a spherical object whose actual diameter equals  and where  is the distance to the centre of the sphere, the angular diameter can be found by the formula

The difference is due to the fact that the apparent edges of a sphere are its tangent points, which are closer to the observer than the centre of the sphere. For practical use, the distinction is significant only for spherical objects that are relatively close, since the small-angle approximation holds for :
 .

Horizon
On terrestrial planets and other solid celestial bodies with negligible atmospheric effects, the distance to the horizon for a "standard observer" varies as the square root of the planet's radius. Thus, the horizon on Mercury is 62% as far away from the observer as it is on Earth, on Mars the figure is 73%, on the Moon the figure is 52%, on Mimas the figure is 18%, and so on. The observer's height must be taken into account when calculating the distance to the horizon.

Mercury

Because Mercury has little atmosphere, a view of the planet's skies would be no different from viewing space from orbit. Mercury has a southern pole star, α Pictoris, a magnitude 3.2 star. It is fainter than Earth's Polaris (α Ursae Minoris). Omicron Draconis is its north star.

Other planets seen from Mercury
After the Sun, the second-brightest object in the Mercurian sky is Venus, which is much brighter there than for terrestrial observers. The reason for this is that when Venus is closest to Earth, it is between the Earth and the Sun, so we see only its night side. Indeed, even when Venus is brightest in the Earth's sky, we are actually seeing only a narrow crescent. For a Mercurian observer, on the other hand, Venus is closest when it is in opposition to the Sun and is showing its full disk. The apparent magnitude of Venus is as bright as −7.7.

The Earth and the Moon are also very prominent, their apparent magnitudes being about −5 and −1.2, respectively. The maximum apparent distance between the Earth and the Moon is about 15′. All other planets are visible just as they are on Earth, but somewhat less bright at opposition with the difference being most considerable for Mars.

The zodiacal light is probably more prominent than it is from Earth.

Venus
The atmosphere of Venus is so thick that the Sun is not distinguishable in the daytime sky, and the stars are not visible at night. Being closer to the Sun, Venus receives about 1.9 times more sunlight than Earth, but due to the thick atmosphere, only about 20% of the light reaches the surface. Color images taken by the Soviet Venera probes suggest that the sky on Venus is orange. If the Sun could be seen from Venus's surface, the time from one sunrise to the next (a solar day) would be 116.75 Earth days. Because of Venus's retrograde rotation, the Sun would appear to rise in the west and set in the east.

An observer aloft in Venus's cloud tops, on the other hand, would circumnavigate the planet in about four Earth days and see a sky in which Earth and the Moon shine brightly (about magnitudes −6.6 and −2.7, respectively) at opposition. Mercury would also be easy to spot, because it is closer and brighter, at up to magnitude −2.7, and because its maximum elongation from the Sun is considerably larger (40.5°) than when observed from Earth (28.3°).

42 Draconis is the closest star to the north pole of Venus. Eta¹ Doradus is the closest to its south pole. (Note: The IAU uses the right-hand rule to define a positive pole for the purpose of determining orientation. Using this convention, Venus is tilted 177° ("upside down").)

The Moon

The Moon's atmosphere is negligibly thin, essentially vacuum, so its sky is always black, as in the case of Mercury. However, the Sun is so bright that it is impossible to see stars during the lunar daytime, unless the observer is well shielded from sunlight (direct or reflected from the ground). The Moon has a southern polar star, δ Doradus, a magnitude 4.34 star. It is better aligned than Earth's Polaris (α Ursae Minoris), but much fainter. Its north pole star is currently Omicron Draconis.

Eclipses from the Moon

Earth and the Sun sometimes meet in the lunar sky, causing an eclipse. On Earth, one would see a lunar eclipse, when the Moon passes through the Earth's shadow; meanwhile on the Moon, one would see a solar eclipse, when the Sun goes behind the Earth. Since the apparent diameter of the Earth is four times larger than that of the Sun, the Sun would be hidden behind the Earth for hours. Earth's atmosphere would be visible as a reddish ring. During the Apollo 15 mission, an attempt was made to use the Lunar Roving Vehicle's TV camera to view such an eclipse, but the camera or its power source failed after the astronauts left for Earth.

Terrestrial solar eclipses, on the other hand, would not be as spectacular for lunar observers because the Moon's umbra nearly tapers out at the Earth's surface. A blurry dark patch would be barely visible. Lunar observers with telescopes might be able to discern the umbral shadow as a black spot at the center of a less dark region (penumbra) traveling across the full Earth's disk. It would look essentially the same as it does to the Deep Space Climate Observatory.

In summary, whenever an eclipse of some sort is occurring on Earth, an eclipse of another sort is occurring on the Moon. Eclipses occur for observers on both Earth and the Moon whenever the two bodies and the Sun align in a straight line, or syzygy.

Mars

Mars has only a thin atmosphere; however, it is extremely dusty and there is much light that is scattered about. The sky is thus rather bright during the daytime and stars are not visible. The Martian northern pole star is Deneb, although the actual pole is somewhat offset in the direction of Alpha Cephei; it is more accurate to state that the top two stars of the Northern Cross, Sadr and Deneb, point to the north Celestial pole of Mars. Kappa Velorum is only a couple of degrees from the south Celestial pole of Mars.

The color of the Martian sky

Generating accurate true-color images from Mars' surface is surprisingly complicated. To give but one aspect to consider, there is the Purkinje effect: the human eye's response to color depends on the level of ambient light; red objects appear to darken faster than blue objects as the level of illumination goes down. There is much variation in the color of the sky as reproduced in published images, since many of those images have used filters to maximize their scientific value and are not trying to show true color. For many years, the sky on Mars was thought to be more pinkish than it is now believed to be.

It is now known that during the Martian day, the sky is a butterscotch color.  Around sunset and sunrise, the sky is rose in color, but in the vicinity of the setting Sun it is blue. This is the opposite of the situation on Earth.  Twilight lasts a long time after the Sun has set and before it rises because of the dust high in Mars's atmosphere.

On Mars, Rayleigh scattering is usually a very weak effect; the red color of the sky is caused by the presence of iron(III) oxide in the airborne dust particles. These particles are larger in size than gas molecules, so most of the light is scattered by Mie scattering. Dust absorbs blue light and scatters longer wavelengths (red, orange, yellow).

The Sun from Mars

The Sun as seen from Mars appears to be  the angular diameter as seen from Earth (0.35°), and sends 40% of the light, approximately the brightness of a slightly cloudy afternoon on Earth.

On June 3, 2014, the Curiosity rover on Mars observed the planet Mercury transiting the Sun, marking the first time a planetary transit has been observed from a celestial body besides Earth.

Earth and Moon from Mars
The Earth is visible from Mars as a double star; the Moon would be visible alongside it as a fainter companion. The difference in brightness between the two would be greatest around inferior conjunction. At that time, both bodies would present their dark sides to Mars, but Earth's atmosphere would largely offset this by refracting sunlight much like the atmosphere of Venus does. On the other hand, the airless Moon would behave like the similarly airless Mercury, going completely dark when within a few degrees of the Sun. Also at inferior conjunction (for the terrestrial observer, this is the opposition of Mars and the Sun), the maximum visible distance between the Earth and the Moon would be about 25′.  Near maximum elongation (47.4°), the Earth and Moon would shine at apparent magnitudes −2.5 and +0.9, respectively.

Venus from Mars
Venus as seen from Mars (when near the maximum elongation from the Sun of 31.7°) would have an apparent magnitude of about −3.2.

Jupiter
Although no images from within Jupiter's atmosphere have ever been taken, artistic representations typically assume that the planet's sky is blue, though dimmer than Earth's, because the sunlight there is on average 27 times fainter, at least in the upper reaches of the atmosphere. The planet's narrow rings might be faintly visible from latitudes above the equator. Further down into the atmosphere, the Sun would be obscured by clouds and haze of various colors, most commonly blue, brown, and red. Although theories abound on the cause of the colors, there is currently no unambiguous answer.

From Jupiter, the Sun appears to cover only 5 arcminutes, less than a quarter of its size as seen from Earth. The north pole of Jupiter is a little over two degrees away from Zeta Draconis, while its south pole is about two degrees north of Delta Doradus.

Jupiter's moons as seen from Jupiter
Aside from the Sun, the most prominent objects in Jupiter's sky are the four Galilean moons. Io, the nearest to the planet, would be slightly larger than the full moon in Earth's sky, though less bright, and would be the largest moon in the Solar System as seen from its parent planet. The higher albedo of Europa would not overcome its greater distance from Jupiter, so it would not outshine Io. In fact, the low solar constant at Jupiter's distance (3.7% Earth's) ensures that none of the Galilean satellites would be as bright as the full moon is on Earth, and neither would any other moon in the Solar System.

All four Galilean moons stand out because of the swiftness of their motion, compared to the Moon. They are all also large enough to fully eclipse the Sun.
Because Jupiter's axial tilt is minimal, and the Galilean moons all orbit in the plane of Jupiter's equator, solar eclipses are quite common.

The skies of Jupiter's moons

None of Jupiter's moons have more than traces of atmosphere, so their skies are very nearly black. For an observer on one of the moons, the most prominent feature of the sky by far would be Jupiter. For an observer on Io, the closest large moon to the planet, Jupiter's apparent diameter would be about 20° (38 times the visible diameter of the Moon, covering 5% of Io's sky). An observer on Metis, the innermost moon, would see Jupiter's apparent diameter increased to 68° (130 times the visible diameter of the Moon, covering 18% of Metis's sky). A "full Jupiter" over Metis shines with about 4% of the Sun's brightness (light on Earth from a full moon is 400 thousand times dimmer than sunlight).

Because the inner moons of Jupiter are in synchronous rotation around Jupiter, the planet always appears in nearly the same spot in their skies (Jupiter would wiggle a bit because of the non-zero eccentricities). Observers on the sides of the Galilean satellites facing away from the planet would never see Jupiter, for instance.

From the moons of Jupiter, solar eclipses caused by the Galilean satellites would be spectacular, because an observer would see the circular shadow of the eclipsing moon travel across Jupiter's face.

Saturn
 
The sky in the upper reaches of Saturn's atmosphere is blue (from imagery of the Cassini mission at the time of its September 2017 demise), but the predominant color of its cloud decks suggests that it may be yellowish further down. Observations from spacecraft show that seasonal smog develops in Saturn's southern hemisphere at its perihelion due to its axial tilt. This could cause the sky to become yellowish at times. As the northern hemisphere is pointed towards the Sun only at aphelion, the sky there would likely remain blue. The rings of Saturn are almost certainly visible from the upper reaches of its atmosphere. The rings are so thin that from a position on Saturn's equator, they would be almost invisible. However, from anywhere else on the planet, they could be seen as a spectacular arc stretching across half the celestial hemisphere.

Delta Octantis is the south pole star of Saturn. Its north pole is in the far northern region of Cepheus, about six degrees from Polaris.

The sky of Titan

Titan is the only moon in the Solar System to have a thick atmosphere. Images from the Huygens probe show that the Titanean sky is a light tangerine color. However, an astronaut standing on the surface of Titan would see a hazy brownish/dark orange color. It seems likely that Saturn is permanently invisible behind orange smog, and even the Sun would be only a lighter patch in the haze, barely illuminating the surface of ice and methane lakes. However, in the upper atmosphere, the sky would have a blue color and Saturn would be visible. With its thick atmosphere and methane rain, Titan is the only celestial body other than Earth upon which rainbows on the surface could form. However, given the extreme opacity of the atmosphere in visible light, the vast majority would be in the infrared.

Uranus
From a vantage above the clouds on Uranus, the sky would probably appear dark blue.  It is unlikely that the planet's rings can be seen from the upper atmosphere, as they are very thin and dark. Uranus has a northern polar star, Sabik (η Ophiuchi), a magnitude 2.4 star. Uranus also has a southern polar star, 15 Orionis, a magnitude 4.8 star. Both are fainter than Earth's Polaris (α Ursae Minoris), although Sabik only slightly.

Neptune

The north pole of Neptune points to a spot midway between Gamma and Delta Cygni. Its south pole star is Gamma Velorum.

Judging by the color of its atmosphere, the sky of Neptune is probably an azure or sky blue, similar to Uranus's. As in the case of Uranus, it is unlikely that the planet's rings can be seen from the upper atmosphere, as they are very thin and dark.

Aside from the Sun, the most notable object in Neptune's sky is its large moon Triton, which would appear slightly smaller than a full Moon on Earth. It moves more swiftly than the Moon, because of its shorter period (5.8 days) compounded by its retrograde orbit. The smaller moon Proteus would show a disk about half the size of the full Moon. Surprisingly, Neptune's small inner moons all cover, at some point in their orbits, more than 10′ in Neptune's sky. At some points, Despina's angular diameter rivals that of Ariel from Uranus and Ganymede from Jupiter. Here are the angular diameters for Neptune's moons (for comparison, Earth's moon measures on average 31′ for terrestrial observers): Naiad, 7–13′; Thalassa, 8–14′; Despina, 14–22′; Galatea, 13–18′; Larissa, 10–14′; Proteus, 12–16′; Triton, 26–28′. An alignment of the inner moons would likely produce a spectacular sight. Neptune's largest outer satellite, Nereid, is not large enough to appear as a disk from Neptune, and is not noticeable in the sky, as its brightness at full phase varies from magnitude 2.2–6.4, depending on which point in its eccentric orbit it happens to be. The other irregular outer moons would not be visible to the naked eye, although a dedicated telescopic observer could potentially spot some at full phase.

As with Uranus, the low light levels cause the major moons to appear very dim. The brightness of Triton at full phase is only −7.11, despite the fact that Triton is more than four times as intrinsically bright as Earth's moon and orbits much closer to Neptune.

The sky of Triton

Triton, Neptune's largest moon, has an atmosphere, but it is so thin that its sky is still black, possibly with some pale haze at the horizon. Because Triton orbits with synchronous rotation, Neptune always appears in the same position in its sky. Triton's rotation axis is inclined 130° to Neptune's orbital plane and thus points within 40° of the Sun twice per Neptunian year, much like Uranus's. As Neptune orbits the Sun, Triton's polar regions take turns facing the Sun for 82 years at a stretch, resulting in radical seasonal changes as one pole, then the other, moves into the sunlight.

Due to its eccentric orbit, Nereid would vary considerably in brightness, from fifth to first magnitude; its disk would be far too small to see with the naked eye. Proteus would also be difficult to resolve at just 5–6 arcminutes across, but it would never be fainter than first magnitude, and at its closest would rival Canopus.

Trans-Neptunian objects
A trans-Neptunian object is any minor planet in the Solar System that orbits the Sun at a greater average distance (semi-major axis) than Neptune, 30 astronomical units (AU).

Pluto and Charon
Pluto, accompanied by its largest moon Charon, orbits the Sun at a distance usually outside the orbit of Neptune except for a twenty-year period in each orbit.

From Pluto, the Sun is point-like to human eyes, but still very bright, giving roughly 150 to 450 times the light of the full Moon from Earth (the variability being due to the fact that Pluto's orbit is highly elliptical, stretching from just 4.4 billion km to over 7.3 billion km from the Sun). Nonetheless, human observers would find a large decrease in available light: the solar illuminance at Pluto’s average distance is about 85 lx, which is equivalent to an office building hallway’s illuminance or a toilet’s lighting.

Pluto's atmosphere consists of a thin envelope of nitrogen, methane, and carbon monoxide gases, all of which are derived from the ices of these substances on its surface. When Pluto is close to the Sun, the temperature of Pluto's solid surface increases, causing these ices to sublimate into gases. This atmosphere also produces a noticeable blue haze that is visible at sunset and possibly other times of the Plutonian day.

Pluto and Charon are tidally locked to each other. This means that Charon always presents the same face to Pluto, and Pluto also always presents the same face to Charon. Observers on the far side of Charon from Pluto would never see the dwarf planet; observers on the far side of Pluto from Charon would never see the moon. Every 124 years, for several years it is mutual-eclipse season, during which Pluto and Charon each alternately eclipse the Sun for the other at intervals of 3.2 days. Charon, as seen from Pluto's surface at the sub-Charon point, has an angular diameter of about 3.8°, nearly eight times the Moon's angular diameter as seen from Earth and about 56 times the area. It would be a very large object in the night sky, shining about 8% as bright as the Moon (it would appear darker than the Moon because its lesser illumination comes from a larger disc). Charon’s illuminance would be about 14 mlx (for comparison, a moonless clear night sky is 2 mlx while a full Moon is between 300 and 50 mlx).

Extrasolar planets

For observers on extrasolar planets, the constellations would differ depending on the distances involved. The view of outer space of exoplanets can be extrapolated from open source software such as Celestia or Stellarium. Due to parallax, distant stars change their position less than nearby ones. For alien observers, the Sun would be visible to the naked human eye only at distances below 20 – 27 parsec (60–90 ly). If the Sun were to be observed from another star, it would always appear on the opposite coordinates in the sky. Thus, an observer located near a star with RA at 4 hr and declination −10 would see the Sun located at RA: 16 hr, dec: +10. A consequence of observing the universe from other stars is that stars that may appear bright in our own sky may appear dimmer in other skies and vice versa.

In May 2017, glints of light from Earth, seen as twinkling by DSCOVR, a satellite stationed roughly a million miles from Earth at the Earth-Sun L1 Lagrange point, were found to be reflected light from ice crystals in the atmosphere. The technology used to determine this may be useful in studying the atmospheres of distant worlds, including those of exoplanets.

The position of stars in extrasolar skies differs the least to the positions in Earth's sky at  the closest stars to Earth, with nearby stars shifting position the most.
The Sun would appear as a bright star only at the closest stars. At the Alpha Centauri star system the Sun would appear as a bright star continuing the wavy line of Cassiopeia eastward, while Sirius would shift to a position just next to Betelgeuse and its own Proxima Centauri red dwarf would still appear as a dim star contrary to its main A and B stars. At Barnard's star the Sun would appear between the not much shifted Sirius and Belt of Orion compared to in the sky of Earth. Conversely the Sun would appear from Sirius and also Procyon around Altair.

From the Large Magellanic Cloud
From a viewpoint in the LMC, the Milky Way's total apparent magnitude would be −2.0—over 14 times brighter than the LMC appears to us on Earth—and it would span about 36° across the sky, the width of over 70 full moons. Furthermore, because of the LMC's high galactic latitude, an observer there would get an oblique view of the entire galaxy, free from the interference of interstellar dust that makes studying in the Milky Way's plane difficult from Earth. The Small Magellanic Cloud would be about magnitude 0.6, substantially brighter than the LMC appears to us.

See also
 Exosphere
 Pole star § Other planets
 Sky
 Timeline of first images of Earth from space

Notes

References

Further reading

External links
 Astronauts on the planets 
 Essay on the possible sky colours of alien worlds.
 JPL Solar System Simulator
 Phases of Charon as seen from Pluto
 The Starry Universe – Life magazine (December 20, 1954).
 Sunsets simulated on other planets (NASA; June 22, 2020)
 
 

Observational astronomy
Planetary science